Pascal Bertin (born 1965) is a French countertenor.

Pascal Bertin began his singing career at the age of 11 years old with the Chœur d'Enfants de Paris, under the direction of Roger de Magnee, with whom he performed as a soloist around the world working with conductors such as Seiji Ozawa, Zubin Mehta and Sir Georg Solti. In 1988 he received, as a student of William Christie the first prize for interpretation of Baroque music from the Conservatoire National Supérieur de Musique de Paris.

As an interpreter of opera and oratorio, Pascal Bertin has performed with conductors and orchestras such as Jordi Savall, Christophe Rousset, Philippe Herreweghe, Marc Minkowski, Emmanuelle Haim, Masaki Suzuki, John Eliot Gardiner, Sigiswald Kuijken, Gustav Leonhardt, Ton Koopman, William Christie, Jean Tubery, Joël Suhubiette, Benoît Haller, Jean-Marc Aymes, Stephan MacLeod, Francoise Lasserre, Gilbert Bezina, Konrad Junghanel, Michel Corboz, Thomas Engelbrock, Paul Dombrecht, Eduardo Lopez Banzo, Marcel Ponseele, Herve Niquet, Pierre Cao, Reinhard Goebel, Concerto Koln, Ricercar consort, Freiburger barock orchester, Academy of ancient music.

He also enjoys an extensive career singing with various leading ensembles performing music of the middle-ages and the renaissance. Among these ensembles are the Huelgas Ensemble, Mala Punica, Daedalus, Doulce Memoire, Clément Janequin, A Sei Voci, Gilles Binchois.

On the opera stage, he has performed in Geneva, Antwerp, Salzburg, Chicago, Tokyo, Lille, New-York Strasbourg, Paris, Nice, Amsterdam, Marseille, Bologna, Lausanne, Luxemburg, Nancy, Dijon...

Pascal Bertin has recorded over 100 CDs from different periods and styles. Among them, 3 with the vocal jazz-ensemble Indigo he founded in 1987.

He is the head of the Early Music Department at the Conservatoire National Superieur de Musique et de Danse de Paris and voice teacher at the Royal Conservatoire of The Hague.

Selected discography
Jordi SAVALL :
 Carlos V, La cancion del Emperador 
Isabel I, Reina de Castilla 
Requiem, BIBER 
Homenatge al misteri d’Elx 
Missa Bruxellensis, BIBER 
Le Royaume oublié, la tragédie cathare 
Dinastia Borgia Jeanne d’Arc, 
Batailles et prisons 
Erasmus, Eloge de la folie 
Messe en Si mineur BWV 232, BACH
HuELGAS ENSEmBLE (Paul VAN NEVEL) :
 Le Printans (1603) CAUDE LE JEUNE 
La Pellegrina 
AGRICOLA A Secret Labyrinth 
 LASSUS Il Canzoniere 
Lamentations MASSAINO, WHITE, DE ORTO, LASSUS
LA FENICE (Jean TuBERy) and Akadêmia (Françoise Lasserre) : 
Vespro per le salute MONTEVERDI 
Selva Morale e Spirituale MONTEVERDI 
Vespro della beata vergine CAVALLI 
Messe en la mémoire d’un prince CHARPENTIER 
L’héritage de Monteverdi Requiem, Magnificat, 
Te Deum TABART
DAEDALuS (Roberto FESTA) : 
Delizie Napolitane 
Oracula LASSUS 
Saturn and Polyphony e two souls of Solomon ROSSI 
Musa Latina
L’Ensemble WILLIAm ByRD (Graham O’REILLy):
 Polish Baroque PEKIEL 
Miserere ALLEGRI, SCARLATTI, LEO 
Stabat Mater SCARLATTI 
Secret Garden TALLIS
FONS muSICAE (ZANETTI, BERTIN, ImAmuRA, BALLESTRACCI):
 Airs de cour LAMBERT
 Sonate e Cantate GASPARINI 
Cantatas, duets and sonatas STEFFANI 
Luci Barbare BONONCINI 
Cantate e sonate CALDARA
Suzuki : Cantates vol 27 et 29 BACH 
Herreweghe : Missa viri galilaei PALESTRINA 
Macleod : German Baroque Cantatas vol 1 et 2 TELEMANN, BUxTEHUDE, BACH 
Maillet : Arie e Lagrime HANDEL, Récital Bertin 
Memelsdorff  : Helas Avril DA PERUGIA Motets CICCONIA 
Pluhar : Vespro della beata vergine MONTEVERDI 
Ensemble Janequin : Messe l’homme armé DE LA RUE La Barca BANCHIERI 
Sempe : La Pellegrina 
Gardiner : War Requiem BRITTEN Requiem FAURE Chansons RAVEL, DEBUSSY, POULENC 
Lopez Banzo : Ay Amor Zarzuelas DE LITERES 
Peral : Cantate sur l’Europe LECOT 
Marco : Maitres de chapelle de Paris au xVIIe CHARPENTIER, DU MONT
Junghänel : Vespro della beata vergine ROSENMULLER Missa Alleluja BIBER Vespro della beata vergine MONTEVERDI 
Cuiller : Leçons de ténèbres RICHTER,
A sei Voci : Sacrae Symphoniae GABRIELI
Laplenie : Messe du manuscrit de Savoie LEJEUNE
Suhubiette : Motetti BASSANO, Méditerranée Sacrée MOULTAKA
Haller : Passio secundum Johannem BACH 
Cao : Vepres à Vienne FUx, SANCES, GLETLE, ZÄCHER

OPERAS / CD Ou DVD : 
Christie : Il Sant’Alessio LANDI 
Haïm : L’Orfeo MONTEVERDI
 Garrido : Le Balet comique de la Reyne BEAUJOYEULx
Gester : La conversione di Clodoveo CALDARA
Minkowski : Mitridate, Re di Ponto MOZART 
Alcyone MARAIS
Amadigi HANDEL
Giulio Cesare HANDEL 
Rousset : Riccardo Primo HANDEL

JAZZ, CHANSON :
 INDIGO Live at Still 88
 INDIGO Quintet à voix
INDIGO Furioso

INCLASSABLES :
 LES 3 CONTRE-TENORS. Récital parodique de Scholl, Visse, Bertin
UNE FETE BAROQUE (10 ans du Concert d’Astrée, Haïm) Pascal Bertin arranged and sang a duet with P.Jaroussky a "salsa" version of the Purcell's "Sound the trumpet"
 Marc-Antoine Charpentier 

 Messe pour les trépassés H 2, Motet pour les trépassés H 311, Miserere des Jésuites H 193 - 193 a, Pie Jesu H 234, Caroline Pelon, Pascal Bertin, Hans-Jörg, Jean-Claude Saragosse, Choeur de Chambre de Namur, Ensemble La Fenice, conducted by Jean Tibéry. 

 CD Virgin classics 1999.

References

External links
Bach Cantatas bio

French countertenors
1965 births
Living people
Conservatoire de Paris alumni
Academic staff of the Conservatoire de Paris